L'uccello migratore (The migratory bird) is a 1972  Italian comedy film directed by Steno and starring  Lando Buzzanca and  Rossana Podestà.

Plot    
Andrea Pomeraro is a history teacher from CastroPietro, Sicily. During an outdoor lesson he receives a letter from his uncle, a politician who lives in Rome and who, thanks to his interest, managed to get him a transfer to the capital's high school.

Arrived on the spot, he meets his uncle who offers him an apartment, but on one condition: this must also act as an alcove for the faithful encounters of the same honorable, as he is married. In order to avoid inappropriate encounters, the two agree with a system: showing the Italian flag from the balcony means that the house is already occupied.

Andrea's first approach with his colleague Delia Benetti and the students is not happy, as he has replaced Professor Verdirame, much loved by the boys. Despite the warnings of Professor Delia, Andrea loses his temper and causes a sort of riot, being reprimanded by the principal.

Andrea is fascinated by Delia's beauty, and in a favorable moment he tries an approach, but she rejects him. At the same time, however, the man is also attracted to one of his students, and when Delia realizes it, he unleashes jealousy on the girl: Andrea, realizing the fact, instinctively slaps Delia, without understanding why.

Meanwhile, the high school was stormed by students and became the headquarters of the student movement, at the head of which Andrea was elected. His apartment is also not spared and this creates other problems for him with his honorable uncle. Initially, Andrea's intention is only to take advantage of his pupil, but when she indulges in him sexually, she manages to immediately bring him to her side. Delia, however, is in love with Andrea and does not hesitate to make love with one of her students, Aldo, in order to obtain from him a compromising document that could threaten her colleague's teaching position. But when Aldo tries to get his hands on her, she pretends to be thirsty and mistakenly drinks some petrol, fortunately without serious consequences.

Meanwhile, Andrea's uncle is put in a plaster cast after an accident; to repair the damage caused by his nephew, he offers Andrea an opportunity to get out of the situation unscathed: to sign a declaration in which he declares that he was forced to organize the riots in the high school under the threat of the students. Andrea refuses to do so, and is then sent back to Sicily.

Cast 
 Lando Buzzanca as Andrea Pomeraro
 Rossana Podestà as Delia Benetti
 Gianrico Tedeschi as  n. Michele Pomeraro 
 Olga Bisera as French lover of Pomeraro
 Pia Velsi as Mother of Delia Benetti
 Ignazio Leone as Police Commissioner

See also        
 List of Italian films of 1972

References

External links

1972 films
Italian comedy films
1972 comedy films
Films set in Sicily
Films set in Rome
Films about internal migration
Italian high school films
Films directed by Stefano Vanzina
Films scored by Armando Trovajoli
1970s Italian films